Montgomery Cemetery is a historic cemetery located near the Schuylkill River on Hartranft Avenue and along Jackson Street in West Norriton Township, Montgomery County, Pennsylvania, immediately adjacent to and southwest of the Municipality of Norristown. Founded in the late 1840s, the cemetery is the final resting place of several high-ranking Civil War officers, as well as one of the former governors of the Commonwealth of Pennsylvania. The cemetery is adjacent to Riverside Cemetery, which was founded a half century later, during the fin de siècle era of the 19th century. The cemetery is currently administered by the Historical Society of Montgomery County, Pennsylvania, located in Norristown, Pennsylvania.

Origins and history
The Montgomery Cemetery Company, which originally owned and maintained the cemetery, was incorporated by act of the Pennsylvania General Assembly on April 10, 1848. The initial members of the cemetery company were William Hamil, John R. Cooken, Adam Slemmer, Henry Freedley, James Wells, Abraham Markley, John Freedley, and Joseph Fornance, with the first five being trustees. The  of land for the cemetery had been sold to the company on March 31, 1848, by one of the trustees, William Hamil, and his wife Willimina. The first burials in the cemetery ensued shortly thereafter.

The cemetery was originally a part of Norriton Township when the cemetery company was incorporated. When the then-Borough of Norristown annexed the land immediately to the northeast of the cemetery in 1853, the cemetery's land, including the road leading to the cemetery (now Hartranft Avenue), was specifically omitted from the annexation. However, the cemetery company's land along and beside Hartranft Avenue, not including the cemetery itself, became a part of the then-Borough of Norristown on January 18, 1909. Less than two months later, the cemetery itself became a part of West Norriton Township after Norriton Township was divided on March 9, 1909.

Notable interments
 Joseph Fornance (1804–1852), member of the U.S. House of Representatives
 John Freedley (1793–1851),  member of the U.S. House of Representatives
 Winfield Scott Hancock (1824–1886), General during the American Civil War and the Democratic nominee for President of the United States in 1880
 John F. Hartranft (1830–1889), Governor of Pennsylvania and General during the American Civil War
 Adam J. Slemmer (1828–1868), officer during the American Civil War
 John Wood (1816–1898),  member of the U.S. House of Representatives
 Samuel K. Zook (1821–1863), General during the American Civil War; mortally wounded at the Battle of Gettysburg

See also
 Riverside Cemetery (West Norriton Township, Pennsylvania) – the modern cemetery which adjoins the Montgomery Cemetery

References

External links
 Montgomery Cemetery on the Historical Society of Montgomery County, Pennsylvania's web site.
 YouTube video of Memorial Day ceremonies at Montgomery Cemetery, 2009 Memorial Day at Historic Montgomery Cemetery
 
 Montgomery Cemetery on The Political Graveyard.
 

1848 establishments in Pennsylvania
Cemeteries in Montgomery County, Pennsylvania